Gaynor Sullivan  (née Hopkins; born 8 June 1951), known professionally as Bonnie Tyler, is a Welsh singer who is known for her distinctive husky voice. Tyler came to prominence with the release of her 1977 album The World Starts Tonight and its singles "Lost in France" and "More Than a Lover". Her 1978 single "It's a Heartache" reached number four on the UK Singles Chart, and number three on the US Billboard Hot 100.

In the 1980s, Tyler ventured into rock music with songwriter and producer Jim Steinman. He wrote Tyler's biggest hit "Total Eclipse of the Heart", the lead single from her 1983 UK chart-topping album Faster Than the Speed of Night. Steinman also wrote Tyler's other major 1980s hit "Holding Out for a Hero". She had success in mainland Europe during the 1990s with Dieter Bohlen, who wrote and produced her hit "Bitterblue". In 2003, Tyler re-recorded "Total Eclipse of the Heart" with singer Kareen Antonn. Their bilingual duet, titled "Si demain... (Turn Around)", topped the French charts.

Rocks and Honey was released in 2013 and features the single "Believe in Me", which she performed representing the United Kingdom at the Eurovision Song Contest 2013 in Malmö, Sweden. After reuniting with the producer David Mackay, she released Between the Earth and the Stars (2019) and The Best Is Yet to Come (2021).

Her work has earned her three Grammy Award nominations and three Brit Award nominations, among other accolades.

Early life
Tyler was born Gaynor Hopkins in Skewen, Wales, to coal miner Glyndŵr and mother Elsie Hopkins. She grew up in a four-bedroom council house with three sisters and two brothers. Her siblings had varied music tastes, exposing her to artists such as Elvis Presley, Frank Sinatra and the Beatles. Hopkins and her family were deeply religious Protestants. Her first public performance took place in a chapel as a child, singing the Anglican hymn "All Things Bright and Beautiful".

Leaving school with no formal qualifications, Hopkins began working in a grocery shop. In 1969, she entered a local talent contest, and after coming in second place, was inspired to pursue a career in singing. Responding to a newspaper advertisement, she found work as a backing singer for Bobby Wayne & the Dixies before forming her own soul band called Imagination. It was around this time that she changed her name to Sherene Davis, to avoid being confused with Welsh folk singer Mary Hopkin.

Career

1975–1978: The World Starts Tonight and Natural Force 
In 1975, Davis was spotted singing with her band in the Townsman Club, Swansea, by talent scout Roger Bell, who invited her to London to record a demo track. After many months had passed, she received a phone call from RCA Records, offering her a recording contract. They also recommended that she change her name again. After compiling a list of surnames and first names from a newspaper, Davis found a new name in "Bonnie Tyler".

Ronnie Scott and Steve Wolfe became her managers, songwriters and producers. "My! My! Honeycomb" was released as her debut single in April 1976, and failed to impact any charts worldwide. RCA increased their promotional efforts for the release of Tyler's second single, "Lost in France", arranging for her to meet with a party of journalists at a French château. The single had no immediate impact upon its release in September 1976, but became a Top 10 single by the end of the year. Tyler's next single "More Than a Lover" was favoured by some critics, and she performed the song on the BBC's Top of the Pops on 31 March 1977. The song peaked at number 27 in the UK.

Despite producing two popular singles, Tyler's debut album, The World Starts Tonight, proved unsuccessful in Europe, except in Sweden, where it climbed to number 2.

"It's a Heartache" saw Tyler return to prominence again in 1978, reaching number 4 in the United Kingdom. The song also became her first hit in the United States, peaking at number 3 on the Billboard Hot 100.

Her second studio album Natural Force, released in the same year, was certified Gold by the Recording Industry Association of America (RIAA) with sales of over half a million copies. "Here Am I" was released as a third single in the spring of 1978, but the song failed to sustain her success in the United Kingdom and the United States, though it charted in other European countries.

1979–1981: Diamond Cut and Goodbye to the Island
Tyler's third studio album, Diamond Cut, was released in 1979. Most of the songs were again written and produced by Ronnie Scott and Steve Wolfe.

Diamond Cut was a hit in Norway and Sweden, but it only charted on the Billboard 200 at number 145. AllMusic declared the album to be the high point of Tyler's early career, "and a dynamite showcase for Tyler's inimitable voice". Record Mirror rated the album three stars out of five, stating that "only a minority of the material [was] holding her back", and that the album is "essential listening" for Country music fans."

Two singles were released from Diamond Cut; those were "My Guns Are Loaded" and "Too Good to Last". Tyler also released "(The World Is Full of) Married Men", which was used as the theme song for the film of the same name. Tyler appears in the film singing the song during the title sequence. It peaked at number 35 on the UK Singles Chart in July 1979. Record Mirror criticised the song; its reviewer wrote: "Bonnie stops chewing gravel for a minute or two..." and continued with "she ends up sandpapering my eardrums again. Ouch."

Tyler's first tour of Japan took place in 1979. During her visit, she represented the United Kingdom in the World Popular Song Festival held in Tokyo. Tyler won the competition with the song "Sitting on the Edge of the Ocean", written by Scott and Wolfe. "I Believe in Your Sweet Love" was also released in 1979, and listed as a single of the week in 1979 by Record Mirror upon its release.

Both singles featured on Tyler's final studio album with RCA. Goodbye to the Island was released in 1981, recorded in the Algarve, Portugal. AllMusic rated the album three stars out of five, with other critics predicting that Tyler was "doomed to be a one-hit wonder". Phil Hendricks from Cherry Records said that Tyler "[proved] time and time again that she was one of those rare artists who was able to take the odd chart flop on the chin and bounce back having suffered little collateral damage."

1982–1989: The CBS Years

After her contract with RCA expired, Tyler signed with CBS/Columbia. A&R man Muff Winwood asked Tyler to scout a new producer. She considered Phil Collins, Jeff Lynne and Alan Tarney, but Jim Steinman was her first choice. "I’m a huge fan of his records, especially his solo album, and when my manager and I were discussing my comeback we both agreed that I had to sound the best or nobody would take me seriously." Steinman initially declined, but reconsidered after Tyler sent him demos of the rock material she was hoping to record.

After their initial meeting, Tyler returned to Steinman's apartment in New York a few weeks later where he performed "Total Eclipse of the Heart" with Rory Dodd. Steinman described the song as "a Wagnerian-like onslaught of sound and emotion", and a "showpiece" for Tyler's voice. Her fifth album was recorded at the Power Station in New York, with members of the E Street Band, Rick Derringer on guitar, Rory Dodd and Eric Troyer on backing vocals, and Steinman as producer.

"Total Eclipse of the Heart" was released in the UK on 11 February 1983. It became one of the best-selling singles of all time with over six million units sold. Her fifth studio album, Faster Than the Speed of Night, debuted at no. 1 on the UK Albums Chart and no. 3 on the Cashbox and 4 on the Billboard 200, selling over one million copies in the United States. Tyler's commercial success led to several award nominations, including two Grammys, two AMAs and a BRIT Award. Tyler was named Best Recording Artist at the Variety Club of Great Britain Awards, and she received a Goldene Europa.

Tyler also found success through some of her soundtrack recordings in the mid-80s. In 1984, she released "Holding Out for a Hero" from the Footloose soundtrack. In the following year, her recording of "Here She Comes" for Giorgio Moroder's restoration of the 1927 film Metropolis earned Tyler a Grammy nomination for Best Female Rock Vocal Performance. Tyler also declined an offer to record the theme for the James Bond spin-off Never Say Never Again.

In 1986, Tyler released her sixth studio album, Secret Dreams and Forbidden Fire. In another collaboration with Jim Steinman, the album also featured songs written by Desmond Child and Bryan Adams and a cover of "Band of Gold" by Freda Payne. "If You Were a Woman (And I Was a Man)" became the album's most successful single, selling over 250,000 units in France. The music video, directed by Steinman and Stuart Orme, received six nominations at the Billboard Video Music Conference.

Secret Dreams and Forbidden Fire found chart success in Europe, peaking at no. 24 in the UK. However, the album only reached no. 106 in the US, where the album received mixed reviews.

In 1987, Tyler collaborated with Mike Oldfield on the title track to his album Islands. In the following year, Tyler played Polly Garter in George Martin's album Under Milk Wood, a radio drama by Dylan Thomas. The music was composed by Elton John, and features vocal contributions from Tom Jones, Anthony Hopkins and Mary Hopkin.

Tyler asked Desmond Child to produce her seventh album, Hide Your Heart, which came out on 9 May 1988. The album featured collaborations with Michael Bolton, Albert Hammond and Diane Warren. The album's singles, "Hide Your Heart", "Save Up All Your Tears" and "The Best" became major hits for other artists.

1990–2000: Success in Europe

In 1990, Tyler signed to Hansa/BMG Ariola and began working with various producers for her eighth studio album. She collaborated with Dieter Bohlen, Giorgio Moroder, Nik Kershaw and Roy Bittan. “We used so many producers in efforts to capture many different moods for many different territories, because we believed in the international crossover potential of Tyler,” stated David Brunner, A&R manager for Hansa.

Bitterblue was released on 11 November 1991. In a retrospective review, AllMusic's Tomas Mureika noted that the album marked a "much more mainstream and less bombastic" direction in Tyler's career. The title track was released a month ahead of the album and became a top 40 hit in several European countries. It was named ‘Catchy Song of the Year’ at the RSH-Gold Awards. In the following year, “Bitterblue” was released as a promotional single in the United States where it was met with criticism. Billboard wrote that “bombastic production, with a rush of bagpipes and a choir of chirping children at the forefront, overpower Tyler's distinctive raspy voice.”

While Bitterblue was never released in the UK or US, the album was a commercial success in mainland Europe. It topped the charts in Austria and Norway, achieving 4× Platinum status in the latter country with eleven weeks at no. 1.

Tyler's subsequent albums, Angel Heart (1992) and Silhouette in Red (1993), were also successful in mainland Europe. Both albums featured a greater share of songs written and produced by Dieter Bohlen. Tyler was named Best International Singer at the Goldene Europa Awards in 1993, and Best Pop/Rock Singer at the ECHO Awards in 1994.

In 1995, Tyler moved to EastWest Records and released Free Spirit. The album featured collaborations with a variety of producers including Humberto Gatica, David Foster and Jim Steinman. The lead single, a cover of Air Supply's “Making Love (Out of Nothing At All)”, reached no. 45 on the UK Singles Chart in January 1996. The album was re-released in March 1996 featuring a cover of “Limelight” by the Alan Parsons Project. The track was used as a theme for the German team at the 1996 Summer Olympics in Atlanta, Georgia.

Tyler's twelfth studio album, All in One Voice, was released in 1998. Much of the album was recorded with Jimmy Smyth in Dublin, and Harold Faltermeyer in Hamburg.

In 1998, Tyler appeared on Rick Wakeman's orchestral album Return to the Centre of the Earth on the song "Is Anybody There?". The album also included narration from Star Trek actor Patrick Stewart and vocals from Ozzy Osbourne, Katrina Leskanich and Justin Hayward.

2001–2003: Greatest Hits and Heart Strings
On 14 September 2001, Tyler released Greatest Hits, a compilation album containing seventeen tracks. The album entered the UK Albums Chart at number 18, and was certified silver by the British Phonographic Industry (BPI) for sales of over 60,000 units. Greatest Hits reached the Top 10 in a further five European countries.

In 2002, Tyler began working on her thirteenth studio album, Heart Strings. EMI approached her with the idea of recording a cover album with an orchestra and Tyler's band. She selected thirteen songs by artists such as U2, The Beatles and Bruce Springsteen. The songs were arranged by composers Nick Ingman and Karl Jenkins, and performed by the City of Prague Philharmonic Orchestra.

Heart Strings was released on 18 March 2003, and was followed by a tour in Germany. The album charted in Europe, reaching the Top 50 in five countries.

2004–2005: Success in France
In 2003, vocalist Kareen Antonn invited Tyler to re-record "Total Eclipse of the Heart" as a bilingual duet in French and English. The new version was re-titled "Si demain... (Turn Around)" and released in December 2003. It went to no. 1 in Belgium and France, where it held the top position for ten weeks, selling over 500,000 units. The success of the single was considered to be Tyler's comeback in France, and received overwhelmingly positive reviews from music critics.

Tyler's fourteenth studio album Simply Believe was released in April 2004. It featured seven new songs and various re-recordings and covers. Tyler and Antonn recorded "Si tout s'arrête (It’s a Heartache)" as a second bilingual duet. It peaked at number 12 in France. Tyler co-wrote the title track of the album, and two additional songs, with producer Jean Lahcene. Simply Believe spent 23 weeks on the French Album Charts and peaked at number 18.

Tyler released her fifteenth studio album Wings in the spring of 2005. It was recorded in Paris, and featured twelve new songs, two of which were also recorded in French, and new versions of "Total Eclipse of the Heart" and "It's a Heartache". Tyler promoted the album with an extensive tour of Europe, including a televised performance at the Sopot International Song Festival in Poland, and recorded concerts at La Cigale in Paris and at the Fiestas del Pilar in Zaragoza, Spain. Footage from all three concerts appeared on Tyler's live DVD Bonnie on Tour which was released in 2006. Wings was issued in the UK in 2006 under the title Celebrate. Tyler also received the Lifetime Achievement Steiger Award in 2005.

2006–2011: From the Heart: Greatest Hits and Best of 3 CD
In 2006, Tyler made her first appearance on US television in years when she performed "Total Eclipse of the Heart" with actress Lucy Lawless on Celebrity Duets. In the following year she recorded a new version of "Total Eclipse of the Heart" with punk band BabyPinkStar and released From the Heart: Greatest Hits, which reached number 2 in Ireland and number 31 in the UK.

In April 2009, Tyler joined Welsh male voice choir Only Men Aloud! on their UK tour to perform "Total Eclipse of the Heart". They recorded the song for their second studio album Band of Brothers, which was released in October. In the same year, she also recorded the title song for Mal Pope's new musical Cappuccino Girls, and performed the song at the opening night in Swansea's Grand Theatre. Tyler also made a cameo on Hollyoaks Later to sing "Holding Out for a Hero" in a dream sequence with Carmel McQueen (Gemma Merna).

In 2010, Tyler appeared in a television advertisement for MasterCard singing a parody of "Total Eclipse of the Heart". She released "Something Going On" with Country singer Wayne Warner and a new version of "Making Love (Out of Nothing At All)" with Matt Pétrin in July and August respectively. In October, she toured with Robin Gibb in Australia and New Zealand.

In 2011, Tyler appeared on Swedish TV show Kvällen är din ("The Evening Is Yours" in English), singing "Total Eclipse of the Heart" with Swedish singer Niklas Paulström. Tyler also performed "It's a Heartache". She also made a guest appearance in the music video "Newport (Ymerodraeth State of Mind)", a parody of the Jay-Z and Alicia Keys song "Empire State of Mind" for the BBC's Comic Relief charity. Also in 2011, Tyler won an award at the BMI London Awards for "It's a Heartache" gaining over 3 million airplays on US television and radio since it was first recorded in 1977. She also appeared on the Ukrainian version of X Factor as one of the three British guests, alongside Kylie Minogue and Cher Lloyd. She performed "It's a Heartache", "Total Eclipse of the Heart" and "Holding Out for a Hero". In December 2011, a portrait of Tyler by Rolf Harris, owned by Cathy Sims, was valued at £50,000 on BBC's Antiques Roadshow.

In September 2011, Tyler released a new compilation titled Best of 3 CD, which charted at number 36 in France. The album featured a cover of "Eternal Flame" by The Bangles, which was recorded as a duet with Laura Zen in French and English and released as a single.

2012–2018: Rocks and Honey and the Eurovision Song Contest
In early 2012, Tyler began working on her sixteenth album, Rocks and Honey. She travelled to Nashville, Tennessee in search of material for the album. It was recorded at the Blackbird Studios in Nashville, and produced by David Huff. Tyler sent the album to the BBC ahead of its release for feedback. After hearing the third track "Believe in Me", they asked Tyler to represent the United Kingdom with the song at the Eurovision Song Contest 2013. Although she was initially reluctant, Tyler accepted, describing Eurovision as "great publicity for my album".

Tyler was announced as the United Kingdom's entrant on 7 March 2013, and was met with a mixed reaction. "Believe in Me" was released on 13 March, and peaked at number 93 in the United Kingdom. As a member of the "Big Five", the United Kingdom automatically qualified to the Eurovision Grand Final on 18 May. Tyler finished in 19th place with 23 points. Reacting to the results, Tyler stated, "I did the best that I could do with a great song", adding, "I'm so glad and so happy that I did it because it was an incredible experience. It was like the Grammy awards all over again."

Following the Eurovision Song Contest, Tyler became the first representative for the United Kingdom to receive a Eurovision Song Contest Radio Award. She received the accolades for Best Song and Best Female Singer.

Rocks and Honey was released on 6 May 2013 in the United Kingdom, and peaked at number 52 on the UK Albums Chart. The album was titled in reference to the contrast between Tyler and Vince Gill's voice on their duet "What You Need from Me", which was likened to "rocks and honey". "This Is Gonna Hurt" and "Love Is the Knife" were released as the second and third singles in August and September 2013 respectively, though both songs failed to chart.

In 2014, Tyler released "Miserere" on Rhydian Roberts's album One Day like This, and "Fortune" on Spike's album 100% Pure Frankie Miller.

In June 2015, Tyler appeared on Die schönsten Disney Songs aller Zeiten, a one-off televised celebration of popular Disney songs in Germany. She performed "Circle of Life" from The Lion King. In September 2015, Tyler performed "Total Eclipse of the Heart" and "Holding Out for a Hero" on Best Time Ever with Neil Patrick Harris, Nicole Scherzinger and Alec Baldwin.

In 2016, Tyler featured on Frankie Miller's album Double Take. In March 2017, Tyler released a new single titled "Love's Holding On" with German metal band Axel Rudi Pell.

In August 2017, Tyler performed "Total Eclipse of the Heart" aboard the MS Oasis of the Seas with American dance-rock band DNCE to mark the solar eclipse of 21 August 2017. The song received an increase of 31,000 online downloads, which led to a placement of number 13 on the Billboard Digital Songs chart. In November, she released a new compilation titled Remixes and Rarities. The album debuted numerous tracks from her back catalogue that had not previously been released on CD.

In March 2018, Tyler embarked on a 22-date tour of Germany and Austria to celebrate the 40th anniversary of "It's a Heartache", with Sharron Levy as support.

2019–present: Recent albums
In February 2019, Tyler released "Hold On" as the lead single from her seventeenth studio album, Between the Earth and the Stars. The album followed in March 2019 and peaked at no. 34 on the UK Albums Chart. It was recorded with David Mackay, who produced Tyler's first two albums in the 1970s. Between the Earth and the Stars features three duets with Rod Stewart, Francis Rossi and Cliff Richard. Tyler embarked on a 23-date tour of Europe to support the album in April 2019, culminating with an appearance at BBC Proms in the Park in Hyde Park, London, and a headline concert at the London Palladium in September. Her show at L’Olympia in Paris was filmed and released through Canal+.

In August 2019, Cherry Red Records released a box set compiling Tyler's first four studio albums. Classic Pop magazine described The RCA Years as “a thoroughly-researched 4CD-set”. In November 2019, Tyler made a guest appearance at Ben Zucker’s concert at the Mercedes-Benz Arena, Berlin to sing “It’s a Heartache”. Their duet features on his live album, Wer Sagt das?! Zugabe!, released in May 2020.

In December 2019, Tyler released a new version of her 2005 song “Streets of Stone” for The World's Big Sleep Out, an international homeless charity event. On 14 December 2019, she performed at the Vatican’s annual Concerto di Natale in the presence of Pope Francis.

In May 2020, Tyler released "Through Thick and Thin (I'll Stand by You)" with Lorraine Crosby as a charity single in aid of the Teenage Cancer Trust. It reached no. 64 on the UK Downloads Chart. Her latest studio album, The Best Is Yet to Come, followed in February 2021.

On 2 September 2022, Tyler and Mike Batt released their duet "Into the Sunset" as a digital single. The track was originally released on the soundtrack to The Dreamstone in 1990. In October 2022, Tyler performed "Total Eclipse of the Heart" live with the cast of Tanz der Vampire in Stuttgart to mark the musical's 25th anniversary.

In November 2022, Tyler embarked on her first ever tour of South America, with eight dates in Brazil, and one date in Uruguay. Speaking with El País, Tyler stated that she hopes to release another studio album in 2023.

Artistry

Influences
Born into a musical family, Tyler grew up listening to a wide range of musical genres. One of Tyler's earliest musical memories was listening to her mother singing opera music in the family home. Tyler attended church until she was sixteen years old. Her first ever performance was singing "All Things Bright and Beautiful" in church. She was also exposed to the music of Elvis Presley, Frank Sinatra, The Beatles and other 60s bands due to her siblings' musical tastes. Frankie Miller was the first live act that Tyler saw, and she later recorded duets with him.

Tyler's two biggest influences from a young age were Janis Joplin and Tina Turner. She cites "River Deep – Mountain High" as being her all-time favourite song. Other artists that influenced Tyler in her youth include Aretha Franklin, Wilson Pickett, Meat Loaf, Joe Cocker, Dusty Springfield and Tommy Steele. She has also expressed admiration for contemporary artists such as Guns N' Roses, Anastacia, Toni Braxton, Duffy, and Eminem. She has also expressed interest in collaborating with Adele, whom she describes as "a great song writer, singer and performer."

Vocal style
Tyler's music contains elements of country, rock, pop, blues and Celtic. Her voice has been likened to Rod Stewart and Kim Carnes as a result of her vocal cord nodule operation in the 1970s, sometimes even being referred to as "the female Rod Stewart", and, after her collaborations with Jim Steinman, "the female Meat Loaf". Soon after her operation, when recording her second album, Natural Force, the studio band complimented Tyler's changed voice. Reviewers from AllMusic have described Tyler's voice as "inimitable," "wonderfully gritty," and an "effective instrument" for drawing notice to her first managers, Ronnie Scott and Steve Wolfe.

In a review of Rocks and Honey, OMH Media described Tyler's vocals as being "good for only one thing and that's belting out gravelly vocals," suggesting that she sounds like Johnny Cash in his later years when she "tries to restrain [her voice]." With reference to her modern voice, The Yorkshire Times wrote that Tyler's vocals have "still got what it takes to make you tingle." Jim Steinman told People magazine that he wrote "Total Eclipse of the Heart" as a "showpiece for [Tyler's] voice." AllMusic said that Tyler's voice "produced the perfect type of 'desperate lovelorn' effect to suit the romantic lyrics."

Songwriting 
Though songwriting has never been a significant part of Tyler's career, she has co-written a handful of B-Sides and other tracks. "Gonna Get Better", a B-Side to the 1980 Japanese single "Sayonara Tokyo", was written with her brother, Paul Hopkins.

In 2001, Tyler co-wrote four songs with Gary Pickford-Hopkins on his GPH album, and duetted with him on the track "Loving You Means Leaving You". Tyler was also involved in writing several tracks for her 2005 album Wings, including its singles "Louise" and "Celebrate".

Philanthropy
Tyler has featured in three charity supergroups. In 1986, she joined the Anti-Heroin Project to record "It’s a Live-In World". The proceeds were donated to the Phoenix House Charities who funded heroin recovery centres in the UK.
In the following year, Tyler featured as a chorus vocalist in the British-American charity group Ferry Aid, who released a cover of "Let It Be" by the Beatles. Proceeds were donated to a charity supporting the victims of the Zeebrugge Disaster. The single sold over 500,000 copies in the UK where it topped the charts for three weeks. In 1990, Tyler joined Rock Against Repatriation to record a cover of "Sailing". It was a protest song in response to the repatriation of Vietnamese boat people who fled to Hong Kong. The single peaked at no. 89 on the UK Singles Chart.

Since the 1990s, Tyler has been a patron of the Bobath Children's Therapy Centre in Cardiff, Wales, who provide care for children with cerebral palsy. In 2013, she campaigned for Bobath to be recognised at the Pride of Britain Awards. Tyler is also an ambassador for the Noah's Ark Children's Hospital for Wales. In January 2005, Tyler performed at the Rock for Asia benefit concert in Ingolstadt, Germany, raising funds for the victims of the 2004 Indian Ocean earthquake and tsunami. The event was recorded and released on DVD. In 2007, Tyler recorded "I Don't Know How to Love Him" for Over the Rainbow, a charity album conceptualised by Anneka Rice on the television show Challenge Anneka. The album reached no. 1 on the UK Compilation Chart, with proceeds going to the Association of Children's Hospices.

On 1 November 2009, Tyler performed as the headline act at the Pinktober Women in Rock concert at the Royal Albert Hall in London. In the following year, she co-headlined at a benefit concert alongside Leo Sayer raising funds for Variety, the Children's Charity, in New Zealand. In 2012, Tyler was named patron of the AAG animal charity association in Guia, Portugal. Tyler re-recorded "Holding Out for a Hero" for the 2013 Children in Need appeal. In 2014, she endorsed the BUAV's campaign to make it mandatory for animals in testing laboratories to be re-homed. In 2020, Tyler contributed to a cover of "Don't Answer Me" by the Alan Parsons Project to raise funds for Bergamo, an Italian city that was deeply impacted by the outbreak of the COVID-19 pandemic.

Personal life
Tyler married property developer and 1972 Olympic judo competitor Robert Sullivan in 1973. They have no children; Tyler miscarried when she was aged 39. Tyler and her family are Protestant.

Since 1988, Tyler and her husband have owned a five-bedroom home in Albufeira in the Algarve. Tyler had recorded one of her albums there in the late 1970s, and the couple spend much of the year there. In 2005, Tyler was filmed in the Algarve for the Polish entertainment TV show Zacisze gwiazd, which explores the houses of actors and musicians.

Tyler and Sullivan have invested in property. As of a 1999 interview, they owned farmland in Portugal and New Zealand, 22 houses in Berkshire and London, and 65 stables offering horse boarding services.<ref>. 7:01 – "Tell us more about your other homes that you live in." Retrieved 17 March 2013</ref> In a 2013 interview, Tyler stated that the farm in New Zealand had been converted to a dairy farm twelve years after they purchased the land. In the same interview she stated that she and Sullivan also own a quarry.

Discography

Studio albumsThe World Starts Tonight (1977)Natural Force (1978)Diamond Cut (1979)Goodbye to the Island (1981)Faster Than the Speed of Night (1983)Secret Dreams and Forbidden Fire (1986)Hide Your Heart (1988) also known as Notes From AmericaBitterblue (1991)Angel Heart (1992)Silhouette in Red (1993)Free Spirit (1995)All in One Voice (1998)Heart Strings (2003) also known as Heart & SoulSimply Believe (2004)Wings (2005) also known as CelebrateRocks and Honey (2013)Between the Earth and the Stars (2019)The Best Is Yet to Come'' (2021)

Honours, awards and recognition

"Total Eclipse of the Heart" and "It's a Heartache" have estimated sales of over 6 million units each, and are among the best-selling singles of all time.

Tyler's 1976 breakthrough with "Lost in France" led to her nomination for Best British Female Newcomer at the 1977 Brit Awards. In the 1980s, she received nominations for two more Brit Awards, and three Grammy Awards. In 2013, she was presented with the Gold Badge award by the British Academy of Songwriters, Composers and Authors (BASCA).

In 1979, Tyler won the 10th World Popular Song Festival with "Sitting on the Edge of the Ocean", representing the United Kingdom. Tyler also became the first and only representative of the United Kingdom to receive a Eurovision Song Contest Radio award in 2013. She was also one of the first western artists to tour the Soviet Union.

In addition to her music awards, Tyler has received local honours in Wales; including being named freeman of Neath Port Talbot in 2011, and an honorary degree and doctorate from Swansea University in 2013. She is also an Honorary Fellow of the Royal Welsh College of Music & Drama. In 2016, she was honoured by the Lord Mayor of Swansea for Services to Music.

Tyler was appointed Member of the Order of the British Empire (MBE) in the 2022 Birthday Honours for services to music.

See also
 List of artists who reached number one on the UK Singles Chart
 List of artists who reached number one in the United States

References

Further reading

External links

 
 

 
1951 births
20th-century Welsh women singers
21st-century Welsh women singers
Women rock singers
Living people
British soft rock musicians
British country singer-songwriters
People from Neath Port Talbot
Winners of Yamaha Music Festival
RCA Records artists
Columbia Records artists
Eurovision Song Contest entrants for the United Kingdom
Welsh pop singers
Welsh rock singers
Welsh Protestants
Eurovision Song Contest entrants of 2013
Hansa Records artists
Members of the Order of the British Empire